The Little Russia Office was a Muscovite state agency (Prikaz) and  administrative body of the Tsardom of Muscovy in charge of affairs connected with the Cossack Hetmanate and the Left-bank Ukraine. The Little Russia Office was part of the bigger Ambassadorial Office and since 1671 was chaired by the head of the office.

Located in Moscow, since 1707 the agency had its resident general in the hetman's capital. Conditions of the office were expressed in articles (or statutes) which were concluded with every newly elected Hetman.

Overview
Noticeable is the fact that the Little Russia Prikase was created about a week later after the official confirmation of Hetman Pavlo Teteria in Chyhyryn after he was elected the Hetman of Zaporizhian Host earlier in October 1662. The prikase sanctioned an alternative elections of hetman which led to election of the Kosh Otaman Ivan Briukhovetsky as another Hetman of Zaporizhian Host in Nizhyn in June 1663 (see Chorna rada of 1663). The creation of dual hetmanship conditionally divided Ukraine along the Dnieper which later in 1667 saw its virtual and legal realization at the Treaty of Andrusovo.

Composition and functions
The prikase consisted of four clerks (dyaks) and 15-40 assistants (podyachny). It controlled the Hetman and its officer council implementing a prikase-voivode system of the Russian administration in Ukraine. The prikase prevented any attempts that were undertaken to succeed Ukraine from Russia in its early stage. In 1722 it was transformed into the Collegium of Little Russia suspending next Hetman elections indefinitely.

Primary
 maintained ties on the tsar's behalf with the hetman's government and representatives in Moscow
 kept the tsar informed of developments
 gathered intelligence
 supervised and supplied the Muscovite garrisons in several of the Hetmanate's towns
 mitigated conflicts between them and the people
 oversaw the construction of fortresses and bridges
 looked after the interests of Russian merchants in Ukraine
 issued travel permits
 settled jurisdictional disputes

Additionally
 monitored the administrative institutions of the Hetman state
 monitored the hetman's correspondence with foreign rulers
 reviewed the hetman's appointments
 interfered in the affairs of the Orthodox church in Ukraine

Heads
 1663–1667 Boyar Pyotr Saltykov, dyak Ivan Mikhailov
 1667–1668 Boyar Afanasy Ordin-Nashchokin (part of Ambassadorial Prikaz)
 1668–1676 Council Courtier Artamon Matveyev, dyaks Grigoriy Bogdanov and Yakov Pozdyshev
 since 1670 part of Ambassadorial Prikaz

Articles
 1654 March Articles
 1659 Pereyaslav Articles
 Moscow Articles of 1665

See also
 Grigory Romodanovsky
 Prikaz
 Governing Council of the Hetman Office

External links
 Little Russian Office at the Encyclopedia of Ukraine
 Little Russian Office at the Encyclopedia of history of Ukraine
 Little Russian Office at the Great Soviet Encyclopedia
 Little Russia Prikase. Soviet Historical Encyclopedia.

1663 establishments in Russia
1722 disestablishments in the Russian Empire
Russia–Ukraine relations
Cossack Hetmanate